The Battle of Hingakākā (sometimes written Hiringakaka) was fought between two Māori armies of the North Island, near Te Awamutu and Ohaupo in the Waikato in the late 18th or early 19th centuries, and was reputedly "the largest battle ever fought on New Zealand soil". One army was from the south of the North Island and the other was from the Tainui confederation of the central North Island. Both armies included allied forces from several different hapū and iwi.

Date
Early New Zealand historian Percy Smith placed the battle at about 1780, basing the date purely on tribal genealogies, but evidence from Maori oral histories from warriors who fought in the battle and were still alive well after contact with Europeans suggests that 1780 is far too early. The Ngāti Whatua chief Te Murupaenga, who led his warriors into action in the battle, was judged by Samuel Marsden to be about 50 when he saw him in 1820. A date of 1780 would make him about 10 - far too young. Other Ngāti Whatua sources said that the battle occurred two years before the attack on the Boyd in 1809, making the date 1807. Oral traditions from Ngāti Maniapoto, Ngāti Te Kanawa and Ngāti Paretekawa place the battle in or around 1790-91. Sources thus differ on the date of the battle, ranging from 1790, to "about 1803" and "about 1807" - with the latter now seeming the most likely.

Origin of the war

The take, or cause, happened about three years before the battle. Pikauterangi, a chief of Ngāti Toa from the Marokopa district was aggrieved over the poor distribution of the kahawai fish harvest, according to Pei Te Hurinui Jones. Other accounts say that Pikauterangi took the biggest fish for himself and he was seized and dunked to the point where he nearly drowned. In vengeance, he killed members of the Ngāti Apakura, who were one of the hapu hosting the fish feast, cooked their bodies and distributed them for eating among Ngāti Kauwhata and Ngāti Raukawa.

Preparations

Pikauterangi then travelled around the lower North Island collecting a large force from many smaller allied hapu and iwi. He raised about 4,000 men from the Wellington region and a further 3,000 from the East Coast tribes of Ngāti Porou and Ngāti Kahungunu. This was combined with a separate force of Te Ati Awa, Ngāti Ruanui and tribes from the Whanganui who had previously fought with Ngāti Maniapoto.

In response, the Ngāti Maniapoto and the Waikato tribes allied with Ngāti Whatua and Hauraki hapu. The alliance made preparations to establish a series of warning systems stretching from Kakepuku Maunga (Mountain) to Taupiri Maunga (Mountain) to alert the Waikato-Maniapoto forces of impending invasion, and a battle strategy to  repel and defeat the invading forces of Pikauterangi,  and constructed a series of "Pā Pahu" (Pā equipped with Warning devices) commencing with 
 Mangatoatoa pā, on the Puniu River just below the Kakepuku Maunga, the assembly point for Waikato-Maniapoto 
 Waiari pā, on the Mangapiko Stream, and 
 Nukuhau pā, on the banks of the Waikato River near the Narrows, and
 Maniapoto pā, in the Gordonton district, and finally
 Taupiri pā at Taupiri, on the banks of the Waikato River. 
When alerted by Ngāti Maniapoto of impending attack or invasion by external forces the Mangatoatoa pā alarm was sounded, which carried to Waiari pā, whose alarm was then sounded which was heard by Nukuhau (pā), who sounded its alarm that was heard by Maniapoto (pā), which sounded its alarm, to be heard by Taupiri and all of Waikato. On hearing the alarm, Waikato-Maniapoto would meet at Mangatoatoa as previously planned.

Deployment and engagement
The attackers, a force of 7,000 to 10,000 warriors, combined at Ōtorohanga They invaded the Waipa District, to restore Pikauterangi's honour.

The invaders were first spotted by Wahanui, a Maniapoto chief, just south of Ōtorohanga. He sent runners to the "Pā Pahu" at Mangatoatoa to raise the alarm, and warn the Waikato-Maniapoto forces of the impending attack.

The day before the battle the two armies drew up before each other. The combined Whatua-Haurakia and Waikato-Maniapoto forces, realising their numbers were far fewer at about 1,600 (some sources say 3,000), arranged bunches of feathers on top of fern to simulate the head feathers of warriors held in reserve, while other chiefs made war-like speeches in the fern to imaginary warriors. Choosing to draw the invading force into ambush, the Waikato defenders chose Te Mangeo ridge line just south of Lake Ngaroto (and west of where the Ngaroto railway station was later).

Te Rauangaanga, Te Wherowhero's father, placed his army on the high ground at the end of a narrow ridge in three groups. The invading force assembled at the foot of the spur (possibly near where the railway line is now). Huahua's Maniapoto forces attacked with their tactic "Te Kawau Maro" (swoop of the cormorant). They charged down the hill in a flying wedge into the centre of the invading force. The defenders reeled back, allowing the attackers to envelop them. The second group of the defending forces then rushed down the hill to hit the confused army of Pikauterangi in the flank. The turning point came when Pikauterangi was felled by a blow from Te Rauangaanga. In a panic the invaders tried to retreat along a narrow gap between the ridge and the lake but were ambushed by Tiriwa's men who had been waiting in the bush along the ridge. The Ngāti Toa were forced into the swamplands along the lake margin; some tried to swim the lake but were killed by patrols waiting on the far side.

Many thousands died in the attack. Pei Te Hurinui Jones of Tainui says that 16,000 warriors are said to have taken part. Combatants included Waikato-Maniapoto, Ngāti Toa and Ngāti Raukawa. Ngāti Raukawa alone are said to have lost 1,600 warriors in battle, including two chiefs. Others came from Taranaki, from Kaipara in Northland, and as far east as Bay of Plenty and Hawke's Bay. So many chiefs died in the battle that it is known as Hingakaka (the fall of parrots), an echo of the traditional mass parrot hunt.

The sacred carving Te Uenuku was lost in the carnage, and not recovered until 1906.

Aftermath

The victorious Tainui warriors considered following up their decisive victory with a campaign against the tribes that had made war on them. However the tohunga of the Ngāti Whatua had a bad dream in which he saw Ngapuhi launching an attack on the Kaipara in their absence. Ngāti Whatua returned to their home land and defeated an attempted invasion by Ngapuhi. Other Tainui wanted to continue the war especially against Raukawa who were seriously weakened and retreated to Maungatautari. Waikato had had enough of fighting for the meantime but in 1810 their warriors set out down the west coast on a raid. At Rangikaiwaka on the coast they met a force of Ngāti Tama and a Ngāti Haua chief, Taiporutu, was killed. As a result of this another Waikato-Maniapoto war party set out to gain utu to punish Ngāti Tama. The avenging warriors were ambushed and defeated by Ngāti Tama and their chief Raparapa.

Battle of Motonui
Around 1819-20, during the Ngāti Toa migration southwards after being evicted from Kawhia by Waikato-Maniapoto after the Te Arawi battle, Te Apihae Te Kawau, of Ngāti Whatua, Kukutai, of Ngāti Tipa (Waikato), and Peehi Tukorehu, of Ngāti Paretekawa (Maniapoto), embarked with some 400-500 distinguished warriors on the "Amio Whenua" expedition to seek retribution or utu from the tribes who had sought to invade their ancestral homelands in the Waipa and Waikato territories during the Hingakaka battle. After encircling the land from Waikato and Maungatautari to Te Arawa and Tuhoe, and through the Tai Rawhiti district to Te Mahia, then on to Wairarpapa and across to Manawatu and Whanganui, the "ope taua" (war party) was eventually besieged by Te Āti Awa forces at Pukerangiora Pā, on the banks of the Waitara River, Taranaki. A large Waikato-Maniapoto force under Te Wherowhero, Te Hiakai, Mama, and others was raised to break the siege of Pukerangiora pā and free the "Amio Whenua Ope Taua" (Amio Whenua War Party). On the way, this relieving force passed near Okoki pā, where they met the Ngāti Toa under Te Rauparaha, with many Te Āti Awa warriors. The Ngāti Toa and Te Āti Awa were victorious in the battle of Motunui, but nevertheless the relieving force continued on to unite with the Amio Whenua War Party, and then returned without further fighting to their homelands at Waikato and Waipa.

This led to further conflict and was the immediate background to the Ngāti Toa forming alliances with Ngāti Tama and Ngāti Mutunga in the great Ngāti Toa upheaval of 1821-22. This attack in turn led to further attacks and counterattacks, building to a climax in 1831 when a large Waikato contingent alleged to be about 4,000 warriors carried out a brutal and sustained campaign over several years led by the great Waikato warrior Te Wherowhero. When women and children attempted to flee the Pukerangiora pā they were killed. When the men emerged in a weakened state many of them jumped over the cliff to avoid the Waikato warriors. The fugitives were tracked down and killed anyway. Te Wherowhero killed 150 prisoners with his favourite greenstone mere, only stopping when his arm swelled up from overuse. The Ngāti Maniapoto Chief Tukorehu showed no mercy to the Pukerangiora people, the same people who had saved his life and his war party 10 years earlier, placing the heads of the Pā's Chiefs, Whatitiri and Pekapeka on poles in front of the wharenui that had housed him a decade before. This act was well known to all the other tribes.

References

Bibliography
 Ballara, Angela (2003). Taua: 'musket wars', 'land wars' or tikanga? : warfare in Māori society in the early nineteenth century
 Burns, Patricia (1980). Te Rauparaha: a new perspective
 Jones, Pei Te Hurinui; Biggs, Bruce (1995). Nga iwi o Tainui: the traditional history of the Tainui people
 Jones, Pei Te Hurinui (2010). King Potatau. 2nd edition, Huia Press, 2010
 Kelly, Leslie G. (2002) [1949]. Tainui: the story of Hoturoa and his descendants. Christchurch: Cadsonbury Publications. Originally published Wellington: Polynesian Society, 1949.
 McGibbon, Ian C.; Goldstone, Paul (2000). The Oxford companion to New Zealand military history
 Phillips, Finlay L. (1995). Landmarks of Tainui

Hingakaka
Māori history
Hingakaka
Hingakaka
Māori intertribal wars
Hingakaka